Mario Petreković (born 8 July 1972) is a Croatian comedian, actor, television presenter and entertainer. He is the winner of the first season of Tvoje lice zvuči poznato.

Filmography

Movie roles

Television roles

Personal life 
Petreković is of Kosovo Croat descent. His former girlfriend Tena Hasanefendić is the daughter of Croatian musician Husein Hasanefendić.

References

External links

1972 births
Living people
People from Bjelovar
21st-century Croatian male actors
Croatian male stage actors
Croatian male film actors
Croatian male television actors
Croatian television presenters
Croatian comedians
Croatian people of Kosovan descent
Your Face Sounds Familiar winners